Fjordia chriskaugei is a species of sea slug, an aeolid nudibranch, a marine heterobranch mollusc in the family Flabellinidae.

Description
Fjordia chriskaugei are commonly 30-50mm in length and are seen in a variety of colours, translucent white with either red, red-brown, yellow, or orange colouring of the digestive gland within the cerata.

Diet
This species feeds on hydroids such as Tubularia indivisa.

Distribution 
Fjordia chriskaugei was described from Gulen Dive Resort at the entrance to the Sognefjord, Norway, . It can be found throughout the British Isles, and can also be found north to Norway, along the Atlantic coasts of France and in the Mediterranean Sea.

References

Flabellinidae
Gastropods described in 2017